Abortion in Denmark was fully legalized on 1 October 1973, allowing the procedure to be done electively if a woman's pregnancy has not exceeded its 12th week. Under Danish law, the patient must be over the age of 18 to decide on an abortion alone; parental consent is required for minors, except in special circumstances. An abortion can be performed after 12 weeks if the woman's life or health are in danger. A woman may also be granted an authorization to abort after 12 weeks if certain circumstances are proved to be present (such as poor socioeconomic condition of the woman, risk of birth defects in the baby, the pregnancy being the result of rape, or mental health risk to mother).

History

The Danish Code of 1683 called for the execution of any unmarried woman who terminated her pregnancy.

The Midwife Regulation of 1714 (Jordemoderforordningen) extended the death penalty to midwives who induced abortions, though it is unclear how often the penalty was effectuated. A 1760 case involving the use of illegal abortion drugs was settled administratively with a fine; a 1772 court case over a woman who died following the illegal administering of drugs likewise led only to a fine; and towards the end of the century, death sentences were routinely commuted.

With the new penal code of 1866, the maximum penalty was reduced to eight years of penal labor. In 1930 it was further reduced to two years in prison, and an exemption was added for pregnancies threatening the life of the mother.

The issue of liberal reforms in abortion laws was raised in public and political debate during the 1920s and 1930s, in parallel with the debate around sexual education and birth control.

Abortion was first allowed in 1939 by application; if the doctors deemed the pregnancy fell into one of three categories (harmful or fatal to the mother, high risk for birth defects, or a pregnancy borne out of rape), a woman could legally have her pregnancy terminated. A little more than half of the applications received in 1954 and 1955 were accepted; the low acceptance rates were linked to a surge of illegal abortions performed outside the confines of hospitals. An addendum to the 1939 law was passed on 24 March 1970, allowing elective abortions only for women under the age of 18 who were deemed "ill-equipped for motherhood", and women over the age of 38.

Abortion in Denmark was fully legalized on 1 October 1973, allowing abortion to be done electively if a woman's pregnancy has not exceeded its 12th week. The 1973 law is still valid today and nullifies the 1970 law.

, the abortion rate was 12.1 abortions per 1000 women aged 15–49 years, which is below average for the Nordic countries (Denmark, Finland, Iceland, Norway and Sweden). The vast majority of Danes support access to legal abortions. In 2007, polls found that 95% supported the right.

Faroe Islands 

Abortion on the Faroe Islands is still governed by the Danish law of 1956, which restricts abortions to the aforementioned three circumstances (pregnancy harmful or fatal to the mother, high risk for birth defects, or a pregnancy borne out of rape), as Danish politicians were historically unwilling to impose the Danish abortion law on the more conservative Faroese population.
Abortion policy was formally devolved to the Faroese Parliament in 2018.

, the abortion rate in the Faroe Islands was 2.9 abortions per 1000 women aged 15–44 years, about one-fourth the rate in Denmark.
Additionally, some Faroese women travel to Denmark to have the procedure done.

Greenland 

Abortion in Greenland was legalized on 12 June 1975, under legislation equivalent to the Danish law.

, the abortion rate in Greenland was 79.7 abortions per 1000 women aged 15–44 years, which is among the highest in the world and about six times higher than in Denmark; the number of abortions have exceeded live births every year since 2013.
Despite being treated as a public health concern, the rate remains high.

References

Denmark
Healthcare in Denmark
Law of Denmark
Denmark
1939 establishments in Denmark
1939 in law
1973 establishments in Denmark
1973 in law